The Iron Springs Recreation Area is a roadside picnic area on Arkansas Highway 7, north of Jessieville in the Ouachita National Forest.  The area has three shelters for picnicking, vault toilets, and an accessible trail for viewing the springs in the area.   The facilities were largely built by the Civilian Conservation Corps (CCC) in the 1930s, with two shelters and the nearby dam listed on the National Register of Historic Places.

Setting and history
The river is impounded by a low fieldstone dam, built by the CCC in 1933, which features alternating chutes and steps, and impounds enough water to form a modest swimming hole.

The picnic area includes three covered shelters, two of which were built by the CCC in 1933. The north and south sides of the shelter have log balustrades, while the other two sides are open; a picnic table is set under the shelter. The second is more square in shape, with a pyramidal roof, but also has balustrades on the north and south sides.

See also
National Register of Historic Places listings in Garland County, Arkansas

References

National Register of Historic Places in Arkansas
Buildings and structures completed in 1933
Buildings and structures in Garland County, Arkansas
Ouachita National Forest
Civilian Conservation Corps in Arkansas
National Register of Historic Places in Garland County, Arkansas
1933 establishments in Arkansas